Harry Frank Harris (September 10, 1895 – March 1969) was an American football blocking back who played for the Akron Pros during the 1920 season,  where the Pros won the first NFL Championship. He went to West Virginia Wesleyan College and West Virginia University for his college career.

References

1895 births
1969 deaths
Akron Pros players